The Duke Plays Ellington is an album by American pianist, composer and bandleader Duke Ellington featuring trio sessions recorded for the Capitol label in 1953. The album was rereleased with additional tracks on CD as Piano Reflections in 1989

Reception
The AllMusic review by Scott Yanow awarded the album 4½ stars and stated: "Ellington sounds modern (especially rhythmically and in his chord voicings) and shows that he could have made a viable career out of just being a pianist".

Track listing
:All compositions by Duke Ellington except as indicated
 "Who Knows?" - 2:37
 "Retrospection" - 3:58
 "B Sharp Blues" - 2:47
 "Passion Flower" (Billy Strayhorn) - 3:05
 "Dancers in Love" - 1:56
 "Reflections in D" - 3:35
 "Melancholia" - 3:20
 "Prelude to a Kiss"  (Ellington, Irving Gordon, Irving Mills) - 3:04
 "In a Sentimental Mood" (Ellington, Mills, Manny Kurtz) - 2:30
 "Things Ain't What They Used to Be" (Mercer Ellington) - 2:56
 "All Too Soon" (Ellington, Carl Sigman) - 3:08
 "Janet" - 2:15
 "Kinda Dukish" - 2:32 Bonus track on CD reissue
 "Montevideo" - 2:33 Bonus track on CD reissue
 "December Blue" - 2:40 Bonus track on CD reissue
Recorded at Capitol Studios, Los Angeles on April 13 (tracks 1-8), April 14 (tracks 9-12), and December 3 (tracks 13-15), 1953.

Personnel
Duke Ellington – piano
Wendell Marshall - bass
Butch Ballard - drums (tracks 1-12)
 Dave Black (drummer) - drums (tracks 13-15)
Ralph Collier - congas (track 14)

References

Capitol Records albums
Duke Ellington albums
1953 albums